The Cogotí River is a river watercourse in the Coquimbo Region that flows from the watershed on the border to the Cogotí Dam.

See also
List of rivers of Chile

References
Cuenca del Río Limarí, Dirección general de aguas, Ministerio de Obras Públicas, Gobierno de Chile

Rivers of Chile
Rivers of Coquimbo Region